Jannik Sinner defeated the defending champion Carlos Alcaraz in the final, 6–7(5–7), 6–1, 6–1 to win the singles tennis title at the 2022 Croatia Open Umag.

Seeds
The top four seeds receive a bye into the second round.

Draw

Finals

Top half

Bottom half

Qualifying

Seeds

Qualifiers

Lucky loser

Qualifying draw

First qualifier

Second qualifier

Third qualifier

Fourth qualifier

References

External links
 Main draw
 Qualifying draw

Croatia Open Umag - Singles
2022 Singles
2022 in Croatian sport